The 1944 Rhode Island gubernatorial election was held on November 7, 1944. Incumbent Democrat J. Howard McGrath defeated Republican nominee Norman D. MacLeod with 60.65% of the vote.

General election

Candidates
J. Howard McGrath, Democratic 
Norman D. MacLeod, Republican

Results

References

1944
Rhode Island
Gubernatorial